N. M. Uqaili (full name: Nabi Mohammad Uqaili) was the Finance Minister of Pakistan and a Chairman of the Pakistan Industrial Credit and Investment Corporation (PICIC).

Early life and career
He headed the privatisation commission during Muhammad Zia-ul-Haq's government to study the condition of the state enterprises and served as the Governor of State Bank of Pakistan. He was known as a successful businessman. His granddaughter is Pakistani politician Sharmila Farooqi.

See also
 Allah Baksh Sarshar Uqaili
 Sharmila Farooqi

References

Finance Ministers of Pakistan
Sindhi people
Pakistani financiers